Nikolay Pavlov may refer to:

 Nikolay Pavlov (volleyball), Russian volleyball player
 Nikolay Pavlov (footballer), Bulgarian footballer
 Nikolai Pavlov (writer), Russian writer
 Nikolay Pavlov, co-chairman of the Russian  National Salvation Front
 Nikolay Pavlov (politician), member of Central Committee elected by the 27th Congress of the Communist Party of the Soviet Union

See also
 Nikolay Pavlov-Pianov, Russian chess master
 Mykola Pavlov (born 1954), former Ukrainian football defender